Vratěnín is a market town in Znojmo District in the South Moravian Region of the Czech Republic. It has about 300 inhabitants.

References

Market towns in the Czech Republic
Populated places in Znojmo District